Glyceria lithuanica is a species of grass in the family Poaceae.

It is native to Eurasia.

References

lithuanica